Najim Haddouchi (born 9 June 1997) is a Dutch football player of Moroccan descent who plays for GVV Unitas.

Club career
Najim Haddouchi made his professional football debut for FC Den Bosch on 12 August 2016, in the 2-1 home game against De Graafschap. He replaced Luuk Brouwers after 77 minutes. He also played matches for Young FC Den Bosch in the Sunday Derde Divisie. In 2018, he left FC Den Bosch for RKC Waalwijk, where he mainly played in the reserves team and was on the bench with the first squad for a few matches. In 2019 he transferred to the Belgian club KVV Vosselaar in the VFV B. A year later he transferred to KFC Dessel Sport.

References

External links
 

1997 births
Dutch sportspeople of Moroccan descent
Footballers from Tilburg
Living people
Dutch footballers
Dutch expatriate footballers
FC Den Bosch players
RKC Waalwijk players
K.F.C. Dessel Sport players
Eerste Divisie players
Derde Divisie players
Belgian National Division 1 players
Association football midfielders
Dutch expatriate sportspeople in Belgium
Expatriate footballers in Belgium